The 2004–05 Swiss Super League was the 108th season of top-tier football in Switzerland. The competition is officially named AXPO Super League due to sponsoring purposes. It began on 17 July 2004 and has ended on 29 May 2005. This second season as Swiss Super League.

Overview
The Swiss Super League season 2004–05 was originally contested by ten teams. On 4 February 2005 the parent company of Servette FC was declared bankrupt. As a consequence of the bankruptcy Servette FC had their license revoked. The eighteen results from the team's first half of the season remained in the league table. The club's second half matches were cancelled entirely and so the second half of the season was competed with only nine clubs. These each played another double round-robin schedule.  Each of the nine clubs had played 34 matches at the end of the season. Servettes parent company had run up debts of over 10 million Swiss francs and had not paid the players wages since the previous November. FC Servette were subsequently demoted to the Second Tier. The championship was won by FC Basel.

League table

Results

First half of season

Second half of season

Relegation play-offs

Schaffhausen won 2–1 on aggregate.

Season statistics

Top goalscorers

Sources

RSSSF

Swiss Super League seasons
Swiss
1